The 32nd Daytime Emmy Awards, commemorating excellence in American daytime programming from the 2004 calendar year, was held on Friday, May 20, 2005, at Radio City Music Hall in New York City & Sponsored by Procter & Gamble. CBS televised the ceremonies in the United States. Creative Arts Emmy Awards were presented on May 14, 2005, while nominations were announced on March 2.

CBS also conducted an online viewer poll to decide the "Most Irresistible Combination".

Nominations and winners
The following is a partial list of nominees, with winners in bold:

Outstanding Drama Series
All My Children: Julie Hanan Carruthers, executive producer; Ginger Smith, producer; Karen Johnson, producer; Casey Childs, producer
As the World Turns: Christopher Goutman, executive producer; Carole Shure, senior producer; Vivian Gundaker, producer; Kelsey Bay, coordinating producer
General Hospital: Jill Farren Phelps, executive producer; Mary O'Leary, producer; Carol Scott, producer; Mercer Barrows, producer; Michelle Henry, producer; Deborah A. Genovese, coordinating producer; Charles Pratt Jr., consulting producer; Robert Guza Jr., consulting producer
The Young and the Restless: William J. Bell, executive producer; John F. Smith, co-executive producer; Edward J. Scott, supervising producer; Kathryn Foster, producer; John Fisher, coordinating producer

Outstanding Lead Actor in a Drama Series
Grant Aleksander (Phillip Spaulding, Guiding Light)
Steve Burton (Jason Morgan, General Hospital)
Roger Howarth (Paul Ryan, As the World Turns)
Michael E. Knight (Tad Martin, All My Children)
Christian LeBlanc (Michael Baldwin, The Young and the Restless)
Jack Wagner (Nick Marone, The Bold and the Beautiful)

Outstanding Lead Actress in a Drama Series
Martha Byrne (Lily Walsh Snyder, As the World Turns)
Kassie DePaiva (Blair Cramer, One Life to Live)
Susan Flannery (Stephanie Douglas Forrester, The Bold and the Beautiful)
Nancy Lee Grahn (Alexis Davis, General Hospital)
Juliet Mills (Tabitha Lenox, Passions)
Erika Slezak (Victoria Lord, One Life to Live)
Michelle Stafford (Phyllis Summers Abbott, The Young and the Restless)
Kim Zimmer (Reva Shayne Lewis, Guiding Light)

Outstanding Supporting Actor in a Drama Series
Jeff Branson (Jonathan Lavery, All My Children)
Tyler Christopher (Nikolas Cassadine, General Hospital)
Justin Deas (Buzz Cooper, Guiding Light)
Rick Hearst (Ric Lansing, General Hospital)
Cameron Mathison (Ryan Lavery, All My Children)
Greg Rikaart (Kevin Fisher, The Young and the Restless)

Outstanding Supporting Actress in a Drama Series
Crystal Chappell (Olivia Spencer, Guiding Light)
Robin Christopher (Skye Chandler, General Hospital)
Jeanne Cooper (Katherine Chancellor, The Young and the Restless)
Ilene Kristen (Roxy Balsom, One Life to Live)
Natalia Livingston (Emily Quartermaine, General Hospital)
Heather Tom (Kelly Cramer, One Life to Live)

Outstanding Younger Actor in a Drama Series
Scott Clifton  (Dillon Quartermaine, General Hospital)
Michael Graziadei  (Daniel Romalotti, The Young and the Restless)
David Lago (Raul Guittierez, The Young and the Restless)
Tom Pelphrey (Jonathan Randall, Guiding Light)
Jacob Young (JR Chandler, All My Children)

Outstanding Younger Actress in a Drama Series
Jennifer Ferrin (Jennifer Munson, As the World Turns)
Alexa Havins (Babe Carey, All My Children)
Crystal Hunt (Lizzie Spaulding, Guiding Light)
Adrianne Leon (Brook Lynn Ashton, General Hospital)
Eden Riegel (Bianca Montgomery, All My Children)

Outstanding Drama Series Writing Team
As the World Turns: Hogan Sheffer, head writer; Jean Passanante, co-head writer; Christopher Whitesell, associate head writer; Charlotte Gibson, associate head writer; Paula Cwikly, associate head writer; Frederick Johnson, associate head writer; Carolyn Culliton, associate head writer; Courtney Simon, associate writer; Judith Donato, associate writer; Lynn Martin, associate writer; Judy Tate, associate writer; Susan Dansby, associate writer; Meg Kelly, associate writer; Elizabeth Page, associate writer; Melissa Salmons, associate writer; Craig Heller, associate writer
General Hospital: Robert Guza Jr., head writer; Charles Pratt Jr., head writer; Elizabeth Korte, associate head writer; Michael Conforti, writer; Michelle Patrick, writer; Garin Wolf, writer; Mary Sue Price, writer; Michele Val Jean, writer; Susan Wald, writer; Michael J. Cinquemani, writer
Guiding Light: David Kreizman, head writer; Ellen Weston, head writer; Donna Swajeski, co-head writer; Jill Lorie Hurst, writer; Christopher Dunn, writer; Lloyd Gold, writer; Kimberly Hamilton, writer; Brett Staneart, writer; David Smilow, writer; Penelope Koechl, writer; Royal Miller, writer; Gillian Spencer, writer; Casandra Morgan, writer; Joyce Brotman, writer; Eleanor Labine, writer; Tita Bell, writer; Danielle Paige, writer
The Young and the Restless: Kay Alden, head writer; John F. Smith, head writer; Trent Jones, co-head writer; Jerry Birn, writer; Natalie Minardi Slater, writer; Jim Houghton, writer; Marc Hertz, writer; Joshua S. McCaffrey, writer; Janice Ferri Esser, writer; Eric Freiwald, writer

Outstanding Drama Series Directing Team
All My Children
General Hospital: Joseph Behar, director; Grant A. Johnson, director; William Ludel, director; Scott McKinsey, director; Owen Renfroe, director; Christine Magarian, associate director; Ron Cates, associate director; Penny Pengra, associate director; Peter Fillmore, associate director; Ronald C. Cates, associate director; Dave MacLeod, associate director; Kathy Ladd, Stage Manager; Craig McManus, stage manager
Guiding Light
The Young and the Restless: Mike Denney, director; Kathryn Foster, director; Noel Maxam, director; Sally McDonald, director; Marc Beruti, associate director; Christopher Mullen, associate director; Robbin Phillips, associate director; Jennifer Scott, associate director; Tom McDermott, stage manager; Herbert A. Weaver, Jr., stage manager

Outstanding Game/Audience Participation Show
Jeopardy!
The Price is Right
Who Wants to be a Millionaire

Outstanding Game Show Host
Bob Barker, The Price is Right
Alex Trebek, Jeopardy!
Meredith Vieira, Who Wants to be a Millionaire

Outstanding Talk Show
Dr. Phil: Carla Pennington Stewart, executive producer
The Ellen DeGeneres Show: Ellen DeGeneres, executive producer; Mary Connelly, executive producer; Ed Glavin, executive producer; Andy Lassner, co-executive producer
Live With Regis and Kelly: Regis Philbin, executive producer; Michael Gelman, executive producer
Soap Talk: Kari Sagin, executive producer
The View: Bill Geddie, executive producer; Barbara Walters, executive producer; Alexandra Cohen, supervising producer; Patrick Ignozzi, coordinating producer; Matthew J. Strauss, coordinating producer; Jennifer Brookman, producer; Jonathan Faulhaber, producer; Dana Goodman, producer; Audrey Jones, producer; Jamie Kotkin-Hammer, producer; Gregory Piccioli, producer; Rachel Weintraub, producer

Outstanding Talk Show Host
Ellen DeGeneres, The Ellen DeGeneres Show
Phil McGraw, Dr. Phil
Regis Philbin and Kelly Ripa, Live With Regis and Kelly
Lisa Rinna and Ty Treadway, Soap Talk
Barbara Walters, Meredith Vieira, Star Jones Reynolds, Joy Behar and Elisabeth Hasselbeck, The View

Outstanding Service Show
30 Minute Meals
Barefoot Contessa
Great Hotels
Martha Stewart Living
This Old House

Outstanding Service Show Host
Two winners were recorded in the Outstanding Service Show Host category, as a tie was recorded in the race between Michael Chiarello and Bobby Flay.

Michael Chiarello, Easy Entertaining with Michael Chiarello
Bobby Flay, Boy Meets Grill
Emeril Lagasse, Essence of Emeril
Martha Stewart, Martha Stewart Living
Bob Vila, Bob Vila's Home Again

Outstanding Special Class Series
Animal Rescue with Alex Paen
A Baby Story
Breakfast With The Arts
Judge Judy
Starting Over

Outstanding Children's Animated Program
Peep and the Big Wide World
Arthur
Dora the Explorer
Kim Possible
Toddworld

Outstanding Special Class Animated Program
The Batman
Duck Dodgers
Rolie Polie Olie

Outstanding Performer In An Animated Program
Mel Brooks (Wiley, Jakers! The Adventures of Piggley Winks)
Joan Cusack (The Narrator, Peep and the Big Wide World)
Kevin Michael Richardson (The Joker, The Batman)
Christy Carlson Romano, (Kim, Kim Possible)
Henry Winkler (Norville, Clifford's Puppy Days)

Outstanding Pre-School Children's Series
Blue's Clues
Sesame Street
Paz the Penguin
Hi-5

Outstanding Children's Series
Endurance: Hawaii
Jeff Corwin Unleashed
Postcards from Buster
Reading Rainbow
ZOOM
Dark Oracle

Outstanding Performer In A Children's Series
LeVar Burton (Himself, Reading Rainbow)
Kevin Clash (Elmo, Sesame Street)
Jeff Corwin (Himself, Jeff Corwin Unleashed)
Donovan Patton (Joe, Blue's Clues)

Outstanding Sound Editing - Live Action and Animation
Roy Braverman, Daisuke Sawa, Thomas Syslo, Mike Garcia, Mark Howlett, Timothy Borquez, Mark Keefer, Mark Keatts, Eric Freeman, Keith Dickens, Jeff Hutchins and Doug Andham (The Batman)
Doug Andham, Daisuke Sawa, Mark Keefer, Roy Braverman, Jeff Hutchins, Mark Howlett, Eric Freeman, Timothy Borquez, Mike Garcia, Brian F. Mars, Kerry K. Brody, Mark Keatts and Thomas Syslo (Xiaolin Showdown)
George Brooks, Mark Keatts, Mark Keefer, Tim Isle, Kerry K. Brody and Robert Hargreaves (Duck Dodgers)
Rick Hinson, Elizabeth Hinson and Jeffrey Kettle (Jakers! The Adventures of Piggley Winks)
Paca Thomas and Robbi Smith (Kim Possible)

Outstanding Sound Mixing - Live Action and Animation
Melissa Ellis and Fil Brown (Kim Possible)
Christopher Maddalone and Dirk Sciarrotta (115th Annual Tournament of Roses Parade) 
Juan Aceves (Dora the Explorer)
Blake Norton, Bob Schott, Dick Maitland, and Carla Bandini-Lory (Sesame Street)
Christopher Allan and Dan Lesiw (ZOOM)

Lifetime Achievement Award
Merv Griffin

Most Irresistible Combination
CBS conducted an online viewer poll to decide the "Most Irresistible Combination". The winners were announced live during the Emmys broadcast.

Ryan and Greenlee Lavery, All My Children
Jack and Carly Snyder, As the World Turns
Nick Marone and Bridget Forrester, The Bold and the Beautiful
Shawn Brady and Belle Black, Days of Our Lives
Bo and Hope Brady, Days of Our Lives
Nikolas and Emily Cassadine, General Hospital
Gus and Harley Aitoro, Guiding Light
Todd and Blair Manning, One Life to Live
Sam Bennett and Ivy Winthrop, Passions
Luis and Sheridan Lopez-Fitzgerald, Passions
Jack and Phyllis Abbott, The Young and the Restless

External links

032
Daytime Emmy Awards

it:Premi Emmy 2005#Premi Emmy per il Daytime